Gustavo Carmona De Ita (born 25 May 1995) is a Mexican professional footballer who plays as a midfielder for Spanish club Salamanca B.

References

External links
 

Living people
1995 births
Footballers from Puebla
People from Puebla (city)
Association football midfielders
Lobos BUAP footballers
Cocodrilos de Tabasco footballers
Tercera División de México players
Liga Premier de México players
Ascenso MX players
Tercera División players
Mexican expatriate footballers
Expatriate footballers in Spain
Mexican expatriate sportspeople in Spain
Mexican footballers